The  may refer to:
 A short-lived ministry during the Meiji period (August–September 1869, August 1870 – September 1871).

Minbu-shō (Ritsuryō)
The ministry, established by the Taihō Code and Ritsuryō laws, was one of the Eight Ministries, in the wing of four ministries reporting to the  out of eight ministries. As the name indicates, this body was concerned with oversight over the affairs of the common people, viewed as taxable producers of goods. The ministry maintained various records: the population census sent from the provinces, cadastral (real estate) records, and tax accounting records.

Ministerial authority under Yōrō Code
The Yōrō Code (a revised version of the Taihō Code that created the ministry), stipulates the powers vested in the ministry, under its . There it is stated that :

In the above "all provinces" does not include the capital. The census for the aristocracy who had clan names (uji or kabane) etc. was under the purview of the Jibu-shō (Ministry of Civil Administration). And the ministry was not "directly responsible for the upkeep of roads, bridgees, etc.," but merely kept such records for taxation and tax transportation tracking purposes.

Popular Affairs certificate 
The shōen system recognized private ownership of reclaimed rice-paddy lands, but did not automatically confer tax-exemption (as some misleading dictionary definitions suggest). From the early Heian period, the tax-exempt or leniency status was ratified by the certificate or charter issued either by this ministry or the Great Council (daijō-kan) itself. (See ).

In the  period (859–877) occurred a breakdown of the Ritsuryō system under the  Fujiwara no Yoshifusa regime, with authorities of the ministries absorbed by the Great Council. The decree of Jōgan 4, VII, 27 (August 826) essentially stripped the ministry of its control over the tax-leniency policy, ordaining that all applications for tax relief would be decided completely by the Great Council of State (daijō-kan), and its ruling delivered directly to the countries by the Great Council's certificate (daijō-kan fu). The ministry still issued certificates for exemptions on the shōen estates, but this was just rubberstamping decisions from above, as before. The ministry was thus reduced to processing clerical responsibilities concerning the provinces.

Hierarchy
The  was headed by the minister, whose office was ordinarily filled by a son or close relative of the emperor, of the fourth grade or higher.

  - "Minister of Popular Affairs"
 aliases: "Chief administrator of the ministry of civil services"
  - "Senior Assistant Minister of Popular Affairs"
 aliases: "Vice-Minister"
  - "Junior Assistant Minister of Popular Affairs"
 aliases: "Assistant Vice-Minister"
  (x 2) - "[Senior] Secretaries"
  (x 2) - "Junior Secretaries"
  (x 1) - "[Senior] Recorder"
  (x 3) - "Junior Recorders"

Under the Ministry were two bureaus:

The yō was a form of conscripted compulsory labor, or more often the goods paid to be exempt from the obligation.

The three forms of taxes were known as   under the Ritsuryō system.

  - "Director"
  - "Assistant director"
  - "Secretary"
   - "Assistant Secretary" 
  - "Senior Clerk"
  -  "Junior Clerk"
  (x 2) - "Accountants" 
 trained mathematicians who calculated tax revenue and expenditures.

  - "Director"
 The director was in charge of dispensing and receipt from the government granaries. so
  - "Assistant director"
  - "Secretary"
   - "Assistant Secretary" 
  - "Senior Clerk"
  -  "Junior Clerk"
  (x 2) - "Accountants" 
 trained mathematicians who kept tax records.

Personages who held offices
 , minister (883–887), known as Zai Minbukyō ("Zai" being the Chinese reading of the first letter of his surname).
 , junior assistant minister (874), minister (896).
  873–947, aka "Uji no Minbukyō" or "the Uji Director (of the Ministry of Popular Affairs).
 The fictional , foster brother of Hikaru Genji was Minbu no taifu.
 Fujiwara no Tameie (1198–1275) was nominal minister, but governance had already shifted to samurai in the Kamakura period

List of translated aliases
 literal
 Bureau of Civil Affairs
 Popular Affairs Department
 Popular Affairs Ministry
 Ministry of Popular Affairs
 Ministry of Population

 semantic
 Department of Revenue and Census
 Ministry of Civil Administration
 Ministry of Civil Services
 Ministry of Personnel

See also
 Daijō-kan

Explanatory notes

Citations

References

 Translations of primary sources
  (Yōrō Code administrative laws and ministerial organization, as preserved in Ryō no Gige, excerpted translation and summary.)
 
 

 Secondary sources
 (organizational chart)
 
 
 — Iowa City, Iowa: University of Iowa Press (1903) Internet Archive, full text

 
 ; (organizational chart)
 
 e-text at Cornell digital collection
 
 
  (tr. of Nihon Odai Ichiran)
 
 
 Ury, Marian.  (1999). "Chinese Learning and Intellectual Life," The Cambridge history of Japan: Heian Japan. Vol. II. Cambridge: Cambridge University Press. 
 Varley, H. Paul. (1980).  Jinnō Shōtōki: A Chronicle of Gods and Sovereigns. New York: Columbia University Press. ; 

 additional sources used to compile English translated names.
 
 
 
 
 
 

Government of feudal Japan
Meiji Restoration
Popular Affairs